D3O is an ingredient brand specialising in advanced rate-sensitive impact protection technologies, materials and products. It comprises a portfolio of more than 30 technologies and materials including set foams, formable foams, set elastomers and formable elastomers.
 
D3O is an engineering, design and technology-focused company based in London, UK, with offices in China and the US. 

D3O is sold in more than 50 countries. It is used in sports and motorcycle gear; protective cases for consumer electronics including phones; industrial workwear; and military protection including helmet pads and limb protectors.

History
In 1999, the materials scientists Richard Palmer and Philip Green experimented with a dilatant liquid with non-Newtonian properties. Unlike water, it was free flowing when stationary but became instantly rigid upon impact. 

As keen snowboarders, Palmer and Green drew inspiration from snow and decided to replicate its matrix-like quality to develop a flexible material that incorporated the dilatant fluid. After experimenting with numerous materials and formulas, they invented a flexible, pliable material that locked together and solidified in the event of a collision. 

When incorporated into clothing, the material moved with the wearer while providing comprehensive protection.

Palmer and Green successfully filed a patent application, which they used as the foundation for commercialising their invention and setting up a business in 1999.
 
D3O® was used commercially for the first time by the United States Ski Team and the Canada ski team at the 2006 Olympic Winter Games. D3O® first entered the motorcycle market in 2009 when the ingredient was incorporated into CE-certified armour for the apparel brand Firstgear.  

Philip Green left D3O in 2006, and in 2009 founder Richard Palmer brought in Stuart Sawyer as interim CEO. Palmer took a sabbatical in 2010 and left the business in 2011, at which point executive leadership was officially handed over to Sawyer, who has remained in the position since.
 
In 2014, D3O received one of the Queen’s Awards for Enterprise and was awarded £237,000 by the Technology Strategy Board – now known as Innovate UK – to develop a shock absorption helmet system prototype for the defence market to reduce the risk of traumatic brain injury.

The following year, Sawyer secured £13 million in private equity funding from venture capital investor Beringea, allowing D3O to place more emphasis on product development and international marketing. D3O opened headquarters in London which include full-scale innovation and test laboratories and house its global business functions. 

With exports to North America making up an increasing part of its business, the company set up a new operating base located within the Virginia Tech Corporate Research Center (VTCRC), a research park for high-technology companies located in Blacksburg, Virginia. The same year, D3O consumer electronics brand partner Gear4 became the UK’s number 1 phone case brand in volume and value. Gear 4 has since become present in consumer electronics retail stores worldwide including Verizon, AT&T and T-Mobile.

In 2017, D3O became part of the American National Standards Institute (ANSI)/International Safety Equipment Association (ISEA) committee which developed the first standard in North America to address the risk to hands from impact injuries: ANSI/ISEA 138-2019, American National Standard for Performance and Classification for Impact Resistant Hand Protection.

D3O was acquired in September 2021 by independent private-equity fund Elysian Capital III LP. The acquisition saw previous owners Beringea US & UK and Entrepreneurs Fund exit the business after six years of year-on-year growth.

D3O applications

D3O has various applications such as in electronics (low-profile impact protection for phones, laptops and other electronic devices), sports (protective equipment), motorcycle riding gear, defence (helmet liners and body protection; footwear) and industrial workwear (personal protective equipment such as  gloves, knee pads and metatarsal guards for boots),

In 2020, D3O became the specified helmet suspension pad supplier for the US Armed Forces' Integrated Helmet Protection System (IHPS) Suspension System.

Product development
D3O uses patented and proprietary technologies to create both standard and custom products. 

In-house rapid prototyping and testing laboratories ensure each D3O development is tested to CE standards for sports and motorcycle applications, ISEA 138 for industrial applications and criteria set by government agencies for defence applications.

Sponsorship
D3O sponsors athletes including:
 Downhill mountain bike rider Tahnée Seagrave
 Seth Jones, ice hockey defenseman and alternate captain for the Columbus Blue Jackets in the NHL
 Motorcycle racer Michael Dunlop, 19-times winner of the Isle of Man TT
 The Troy Lee Designs team of athletes including three-times Red Bull Rampage winner Brandon Semenuk
 Enduro rider Rémy Absalon, 12-times Megavalanche winner.

Awards and recognition
D3O has received the following awards and recognition: 
 2014: Queen’s Award for Enterprise 
 2016: Inclusion in the Sunday Times Tech Track 100 ‘Ones to Watch’ list 
 2017: T3 Awards together with Three: Best Mobile Accessory
 2018: British Yachting Awards – clothing innovation 
 2019: ISPO Award – equipment 
 2022/2023: ISPO Textrends Award - Accessories & Trim

References

Materials
Non-Newtonian fluids
Motorcycle apparel